The Trinity–Antonian Cricket Encounter (known as The Hill Country Battle of the Blues) is the leading annual school cricket match (Big Match) of the hill country which is played between Trinity College, Kandy and St. Anthony's College, Kandy since 1914. It is considered to be one of the oldest annual school cricket encounters in Sri Lanka. This encounter is being played for the John Halangoda Memorial Trophy and is awarded to the team who manages to win the match by means of an outright win or failing that, a first innings win. But a first innings win will not go into the records as a win to the relevant team.

Out of the 102 games played, the Trinitians have won 23 with 11 ending in favour of the Antonians. The last outright win for the Antonians was in 1992 and Trinity won last under Niroshan Dickwella in 2012 after the 1986 win under Thushara Weerasuriya. The victory came after 26 years. St. Anthony's College, Kandy are the current holders of the trophy after their 1st innings win in 2019 as they managed to restrict Trinity College to 173 after posting 298 for the loss of 8 wickets.

The winner of the limited overs encounter, usually played a week after the 2-day match, will be awarded the Sir Richard Aluwihare Trophy.

History 

The first  encounter was played at the   Bogambara Grounds in March 1914; the Antonians won.   Trinity won the next match, and a long-contested series has followed.

1918 to 1929, during the World War I St. Anthony's College premises including the practice pitches and the playing-fields were occupied by the British Army. As a result, Antonian cricket deprived and they had lost to Trinity for 11 times consecutively. Without a playground of their own, The Antonians were no match for the Trinitians even with the like of legendary Jack Anderson in the team.

The post-war period (1929–1947) was inauspicious for the Antonians, as they had a poor run in the field. Trinity during that time had C. Dharmalingam, a left-arm bowler who for two consecutive years nagged the Antonians with his left-arm spin. In 1938 he took 9 for 14 and in 1939 had the figures of 6 for 17 and 6 for 31 inclusive of a double hat-trick, a world record.

Then there was T. B. Werapitiya with scores of 100 in 1943 and 143 in 1944, the highest score made by a Trinitian. Meanwhile, the Antonians came back fighting in 1947, and nearly tumbled the Trinitians Asgiriya after getting back their premises, with facilities restored and having the services of a renowned cricket coach in Mr. John Halangoda. The strong Trinity batting line-up crumbled under the spin bowling of Dicky Dunuwille, the Antonian mystery bowler who was later responsible in changing the fortunes of Antonian cricket. Antonians however lost the match by 68 runs due to a spectacular fielding performance where seven close-in-catches were grabbed by Trinity's Clarence Senanayake to dismiss the Antonians.

The Antonians won the very next encounter (1948) at Katugastota Oval where Dicky Dunuwilla taking 6 for 10 once again mesmerized the Trinitians and the Antonians since then have not looked back. During the post-independence period  (1947–1997) Trinity has registered only four wins against the Antonian tally of eight wins. Most Antonian victories (11) in the series have been registered during the period.

A disagreement between the two schools, regarding the age rule resulted in the cancellation of the  match in 1956 and 1957. Also, in 2001 the match did not play as the Trinity stopped playing mid way during that season due to disciplinary reasons.

Notable persons who have played

Past records

Notable performances 

Centuries

Captains

See also 
Royal–Thomian

References

External links 
 Down the memory lane-Antonians.org
 Trinity College website

Big Matches
Trinity College, Kandy